Ghousavi Shah (Persian/Urdu:) (4 November 1955) is a Muslim Sufi Mystic Teacher, Writer and Columnist said to be famous as a great humanist in south India.

Biography
Moulana Ghousavi Shah belongs to spiritual lineage (Sufi Order) known as "Silsila-E-Sahvia Ghousia Kamalia". He is the grandson of Moulana Ghousi Shah, the successor khalifa of Syed Machliwale Shah a renowned Sufi saint. His father Moulana Sahvi Shah translated Quran and wrote many books on Tasawwuf and poetry. Ibne Arabi, who died in the year 1245 A.D. is the master of this order. Moulana Ghousavi Shah learnt Fussos-il-Hikam from his father and became an authority on Wahdat-ul-Wujood. Moulana Ghousavi Shah imbibed the love of learning from his father and engrossed himself in Tasawwuf and writing books. His Khankhah "Baith-Un-Noor" is a spiritual center for people who want to explore their soul irrespective of caste and creed.

Education
He studied the Quran, and the traditions and learnt Persian, Arabic, English and Urdu. His father taught him Sulook (mysticism), Sufi orders and virtues of tolerance.

Successor
He is the successor of Moulana Sahvi Shah.

Titles
  Sharah Rumooze Quran-O-Hadith (Quranic Spiritual Analyst)
  Shaik-Ul-Islam Alambardare Sunniat
  Imam-Ut-Tareeqath
  Imam Ilmul Adad Wal Awfaq (Master of Numerology)
  Peshwae Ahle Sunnat (Chief of Ahle Sunnat)

Works
  He wrote more than 50 books. His book "Tajalliyat-E-Rabbani"( The holy verses of Quran through images) is the first book of its kind in the history of Islam.
  He observes the annual anniversaries of the deaths of Imam-E-Azam Abu Hanifa and Shaik-E-Akbar Mohiuddin ibne Arabi.
  He simplified the teachings of Shaik-E-Akbar Mohiuddin ibne Arabi, in consonance with the times.
  He is the founder of Arabic Academy (Government Registered Number 169/92, Andhra Pradesh, India) for learning and understanding the Quran and Hadith.
  He established the Conference of World Religions (Government Registered Number 2500 of 1988, Andhra Pradesh, India) to bring all the religions to one platform.
  He conducted many conferences to inculcate national integration and religious harmony.
  He established "The World Peace Conference", held on 5 March 1989 at Hyderabad to propagate the Islamic teachings of brotherhood of mankind and to strengthen world peace.

Tajalliyat-E-Rabbani
He wrote the book "Tajalliyat-E-Rabbani" on interpretation of the Quran. This book depicts the Quranic verses through images and explains them in Urdu and English for the younger generation.

Books
 Tajalliyat-E-Rabbani(Ayat-E-Qurani Tasveeron ki Zubani)
 Makhzanul Quran
 Quran se Interview
 An Interview with the Holy Quran
 Afsah-Ul-Arab
 Rasool-E-Jahan
 Azmath-E-Madina
 Fazail-E-Kalima-E-Tayaba
 Meezan-Ul-Tareeqath
 Asrar-Ul-Wujood
 Husn-E-Hussain
 Azmath-E-Ahle Baith
 Mazarat-E-Muqaddasa
 Dayarain
 Majmua-E-Amliyath
 Hayat-Un-Nabi
 Tareeq-E-Sunniath
 Tareeq-E-Sufi
 Aqaid-E-Sunnia
 Aqaid-E-Ahle Sunnat
 Ahkame Quran wa Hadith
 Huzoor ka Safar-E-Hajj
 Tazkira-E-Noman Hazrath Abu Hanifa
 Tazkira-E-Hazrath Shaikh-E-Akbar
 Mukhtasar Tazkira Hazrath Banda Nawaz
 Mirat-Ul-Arifeen
 Kitab-E-Sulook
 Mukhtasar Kitab-Ul-Hadith
 Jawaz-E-Milad-Un-Nabi
 Jawaz-E-Fatiha
 Tajalliyat-E-Arba
 Ayaat-E-Barkat
 Jawaz-E-Tasveer
 Tarjuma Kalimat-E-Kamaliya
 Gulkada-E-Khayal
 Mohammadi Duaein
 Khatam-Un-Nabaeen
 Aimma-E-Arba
 The Great Imam
 Taj-Ul-Wazaif
 Johar-E-Sulaimani
 Ramzan aur Roze
 Tarjuma Kibriyat-E-Ahmer
 Dua-E-Arsh-Ul-Arsh
 Tasbihat-E-Ghousavi
 Aan Huzoor ki Dua-E-Maghfirat aur Sama-E-Mauta(Murde Sunte Hain)
 Aqaid-E-Sufia wa Sunnia
 Tauseef-E-Kamaal
 Qasida-E-Ghousia
 Tareeq-E-Araas

Booklets
 Ahkame Quran wa Hadith
 Haqeeqth us Salaat
 Ahmiat-E-Jumma(Salath)
 Ahmiat-E-Namaz
 Nazr-E-Hussain
 Ittehade islami
 Shanakhte Muslim
 Fiqa ki Ahmiyat
 Radd-E-ilhad
 Radd-E-Bidat-E-Sayya
 Radd-E-Qadyaniyat
 Deen ki Ahem Batein
 Tasbeeh Taraveeh
 Shairiat Kya Hai?
 Azmath-E-Salaam Ba Huzoor Khairul Anaam
 Sunni Tareeqa-E-Tajheez wa Takfeen
 Payam-E-Eid
 Sunni Bedari Alarm
 Jawaz-E-Milad-Un-Nabi in English and Urdu
 Huzoor Ne Apni Ankhoan Se Khuda ko Dekha(At the time of Meraj)
 Marajul Bahrain
 Tazkera-E-Gareeb Nawaz
 Ashab-E-Kahaf ab bhi zinda hain
 Jawaz-E-Taqleed
 Tohafa-E-Ghousavi Hajiyoan ke liye
 Hindustan aur Hum
 Shatihaat-E-Ghousi
 Jawaz-E-laanat bar yazid

Islamic Posters
 Ahkame Quran wa Hadith
 Chart Poster (Aqsam Hadith Bek Nazar)
 Taqleed-E-Aimma
 Shairiat ki Aad mein Jahalat aur Munafiqat
 Gardishi Jamaat
 Deen ki Ahem Batein
 Jawaz-E-Fatiha Chart
 Haqq Sufia
 Maslak-E-Sunni Hanafi Chart
 Hum Sunni Hain

Conference of World Religions
  In 1987, he organized the first Conference of World Religions and brought all the religions on to one platform. This function attracted delegates from many parts of the world. He was the Secretary General of the Conference. The conference received encomiums from the scholars and public in large.
  In 1991, Second Conference of World Religions was organized at Hyderabad. Again it promoted religious harmony and national integration among all religions. Attended by scholars and public from all corners of India.
  In 1993, Third Conference of World Religions was held at Machilipatnam a coastal city in the south India. People are urged to understand that "Humanity is the primary objective of all religions".

Teachings
General teachings
 God Almighty, is the creator of all things in the Universe.
 God alone is the giver of profits and losses.
 God the high above, fulfills the inherent needs and demands of whole of his creation to the highest pitch (directly as well as through some media or source).
 God is neither a soul nor merely a power, but He is the creator of all such forces.
 Nothing is self existing in reality but is subject to the act of creator i.e. God.
 God is apparent by the shape of everything and is free from every shape. Everything is manifestation of God yet He is infinite and above His manifestations.
 God is light and existence, whereas the creation without Him, in fact, is in the darkness of non-existence.
 God is found of expression and man is in want of existence.
 The human being is the everlasting bondman of the God high above (Man is the eternal and permanent slave of God).
 Nothing has movement, except with the force of God.
 Believe that God is with me and every act of me is in His sight.
 We should worship God in a manner, as if we are seeing Him.
 Man is bound to believe and accept all the previous prophets and messengers of God, with the due respect and without any prejudice. Man should also believe in the Holy Books and scriptures, revealed upon then by God. The vested interest of priest lords have, perhaps, corrupted some of the teachings. Now all human beings should follow the tenets of Islam, as enjoined in the Holy Quran and the traditions of Mohammad which cover and complete the mission of the all previous messengers of God.
 The Prophet of Islam, Mohammad is the last of God's messengers. He is for the whole universe and for all time.
 The Holy Principle of La-Ilaaha-illallahu Mohammadur-Rasoolullahi. (There is no God save Allah and Mohammad is his Prophet), is the guiding light from God and final and obligatory commandment.
 In the light of Islam, all human beings are equal in the eyes of God irrespective of caste, creed class, colour. If there is any difference, it is on account of their good deeds.
 Patriotism is part and parcel of belief (i.e., Iman).
 As per one Hadees, The Islamic prophet Mohammad felt the smell of love from our motherland India. We are proud of being Indians. According to teaching of Islam one should give respect and be obedient to the ruler of his country and follow the constitution and rule of his motherland.

Conferences and meetings

Moulana Ghousavi Shah arranged conferences of national and international importance.

 9 January 1987: Foundation of All India Arabic Academy and Foundation of Falahe Muslim society.
 10 January 1987: First Jalsa in the memory of Imam-E-Azam Abu Hanifa

 5 March 1987: First Conference of World Religions at Exhibition Grounds, Hyderabad.

 5 March 1989: The World Peace Conference was held at Exhibition Grounds, Hyderabad.
 13 January 1990: Fiqa Conference at Urdu Ghar, Moghalpura, Hyderabad.

 6 February 1990: Regional Conference of World Religions in Town Hall, Machilipatnam.

 11 February 1991: Peace Meet, Gandhi Bhavan, Bellary, Karnataka.

 22 April 1991: Quran Hadith Conference, Cheetah Camp, Trombay, Mumbai.

 25 December 1991: Second Conference of World Religions, Quli Qutub Shah Stadium, Hyderabad.

 8 April 1992: Second Quran and Hadith Conference at Historic Mecca Masjid, Hyderabad.

 27 June 1993: Third Conference of World Religions, Konere Center, Machlipatnam.

 19 March 1994: The World Muslim Conference was held at Quli Qutub Shah Stadium, Hyderabad.

 16 January 1996: All Karnataka Quran Hadith Conference, Bellary, Karnataka.

 1 November 1996: Khatme Nabuwath Conference, Khilwat Grounds, Hyderabad.

 7 September 2001: All India Sunni Char Aimma Conference, Jama Masjid, Afzalgunj, Hyderabad.

 4 July 2007: First Azmath-E-Rasool Conference, Jubilee Hall, Public Gardens, Hyderabad.

 5 March 2010: Jashn-E-Milad-Un-Nabi at Sangareddy, Hyderabad, India.

 2 June 2010: Second Azmath-E-Rasool Conference, Jubilee Hall, Public Gardens, Hyderabad.

 3 September 2011: Sahaba ki nazar mein Azmath-E-Ahle Baith

Some Books on Moulana Ghousavi Shah
 Touseefae-E-Ghousavi in Urdu by Md. Abdul Razzak, MRO Jangaon(Warangal district).
 A Messenger of Peace by Abdul Ghani Saheb, Bellary.
 Shanti-Ka-Suraj in Hindi by Dr. Khan Aftaab, Bombay.
 Divya-Gnana-Tejamurty in Telugu by Imam Mohiuddin Jameel – Machilipatnam.

Zikr
Zikr (Dhikr) is a sufi method in which God's name and virtues are repeated in a specific way. Moulana Ghousavi Shah says Noor (light) encompasses your mind, body and spirit when you practice zikr consistently with devotion. The heart-beats are transformed into spiritual beats, expelling all darkness lauding the virtues of zikr. Every Sunday many people of all ages attend zikr at his residence (Khankah).

Urs
Annual death ceremony is referred to as Urs in Sufi circles. On this occasion teachings of the sufi saint are propagated whose Urs is being performed. Every year he conducts Urs of Shaik-E-Akbar Mohiuddin ibne Arabi, Syed Sultan Mahmoodullah Shah Hussaini, Syed Machiliwale Shah, Moulana Peer Ghousi Shah, Moulana Peer Sahvi Shah to promote their teachings and also to solve pressing problems of the time.

Related
 Hazrath Ghousi Shah
 Hazrath Kareemullah Shah
 Hazrath Machiliwale Shah
 Hazrath Mahmoodullah Shah
 Moulana Sahvi Shah

Gallery

References 

Chishti Order
Scholars of Sufism
1955 births
Sufi mystics
Indian male poets
Writers from Hyderabad, India
Indian Sufis
Sufi poets
Living people
Barelvis